Field Marshal James O'Hara, 2nd Baron Tyrawley and 1st Baron Kilmaine, PC (1682 – 14 July 1774), was an Irish officer in the British Army. After serving as a junior officer in Spain and the Low Countries during the War of the Spanish Succession, he went on to become British ambassador to Lisbon establishing a close relationship with King John V there. He undertook a tour as British ambassador to Saint Petersburg before becoming Governor of Gibraltar where he set about improving the fortifications. He was briefly commander of British troops in Portugal during the Seven Years' War but was replaced within a few months. During his military career, he was colonel of eight different regiments.

Military career
Born the son of Charles O'Hara, 1st Baron Tyrawley, and Frances O'Hara (née Rouse), James O'Hara was commissioned as a lieutenant in the Royal Fusiliers on 15 March 1703. He was promoted to captain on 24 March 1705.

O'Hara fought at the Siege of Barcelona in April 1706 and was wounded at the Battle of Almansa in April 1707 during the War of the Spanish Succession. He was redeployed to the Low Countries as aide-de-camp to the Duke of Marlborough and was wounded again at the Battle of Malplaquet in September 1709. He succeeded his father as colonel of the Royal Fusiliers in January 1713 and then served with his regiment in Minorca for several years. For this he was appointed an aide-de-camp to the King in 1717 and, while serving in Ireland, was created Baron Kilmaine in the Peerage of Ireland on 2 January 1722. He succeeded his father as 2nd Baron Tyrawley in June 1724.

Lord Tyrawley and Kilmaine (as he was now) was appointed British ambassador to Lisbon in January 1727 establishing a close relationship with King John V there. Promoted to brigadier-general on 18 December 1735 and to major-general on 17 July 1739, he also became colonel of the 5th Regiment of Horse in August 1739. After retiring from his post in Lisbon in January 1741, he declined an American command later that year. Promoted to lieutenant-general on 5 April 1743, he became colonel of the 2nd Troop Horse Grenadier Guards later that month and was appointed British ambassador to Saint Petersburg in November 1743. He retired from the Saint Petersburg post in February 1745.

Lord Tyrawley became colonel of the 3rd Troop of Horse Guards in April 1745 and colonel of the Lord Tyrawley's Regiment in December 1746 before becoming Governor of Minorca in 1747. He was elected Fellow of the Royal Society in January 1748. He went on to become colonel of the 14th Regiment of Dragoons in July 1749,  colonel of the 3rd (King's Own) Regiment of Dragoons in July 1752 and colonel of the Coldstream Guards in April 1755.

Tyrawley became Governor of Gibraltar in 1756 and set about improving the fortifications. These changes came under criticism from William Skinner who was British Chief Engineer. The two of them were called before the bar of the House of Commons where Lord Tyrawley harangued Skinner who took the anger in good humour. Tyrawley went on to be Governor of Portsmouth in 1759.

Promoted to full general on 14 March 1761,  Lord Tyrawley and Kilmaine returned to Lisbon as British ambassador and commander of British troops in February 1762 for the duration of the Seven Years' War but was replaced by General John Burgoyne in July 1762 and returned to England in protest. Promoted to field marshal on 10 June 1763, he moved to Milbourne House in Barnes in 1770. He died at Twickenham on 14 July 1774 and was buried in the chapel of the Royal Hospital Chelsea.

Family
In November 1724, Lord Tyrawley and Kilmaine married Mary Stewart, daughter of The 2nd Viscount Mountjoy. He had no children by this marriage but had at least two illegitimate children including Charles O'Hara, who followed him into the Army, and George Anne Bellamy, who became an actress.
The diarist Sylas Neville mentions meeting a naval officer stationed at Great Yarmouth in 1771 "whose name is O'Hara, a natural son of Lord Tyrawley"  but this is likely to have been naval Lieutenant William Henry King O'Hara (d. 1789).

References

Sources
 Baron's Tyrawley accounts from Russia have been released in: Сборник Императорского русского исторического общества, том 102: Дипломатическая переписка английских послов и посланников при русском дворе: Сообщ. из англ. гос. архива М-ва иностр., часть 12-ая: 1744 - 1745 г., С -Петербург 1898.
 

|-

1682 births
1774 deaths
People from County Mayo
People from County Galway
14th King's Hussars officers
3rd The King's Own Hussars officers
4th Royal Irish Dragoon Guards officers
Barons in the Peerage of Ireland
British field marshals
British Life Guards officers
Coldstream Guards officers
Royal Fusiliers officers
Royal Lincolnshire Regiment officers
Irish officers in the British Army
Ambassadors of Great Britain to Portugal
Members of the Privy Council of Ireland
Fellows of the Royal Society
British Army personnel of the War of the Spanish Succession
Peers of Ireland created by George I
British Army personnel of the Seven Years' War